William Reeves (22 March 1888 – 23 August 1940) was an Australian rules footballer who played with Fitzroy in the Victorian Football League (VFL).

Notes

External links 

1888 births
1940 deaths
Australian rules footballers from Victoria (Australia)
Fitzroy Football Club players
People from Castlemaine, Victoria